Opogona omoscopa is a moth of the family Tineidae.

Distribution
It is found in western Australia, New Zealand, south-east Asia, in Africa from Ethiopia to South Africa and several islands of the Indian Ocean. It is also one of the few species that had been recorded on the remote island of Île Amsterdam of the French Southern and Antarctic Territories. It is an introduced species in the United States, Europe and the United Kingdom.

Biology
The wingspan is about 18-22 mm.

The larvae feed on various types of decaying vegetation including rotting wood, cork, compost, rhubarb, gladioli corms and pineapple roots.
Host-plants include: Persea sp. (Lauraceae), Limonium sp. (Plumbaginaceae), Cyclamen sp. (Myrsinaceae), Thuja sp. (Cupressaceae), Fuchsia sp. (Onagraceae), Saccharum sp. (Poaceae) and Quercus suber (Fagaceae).

References

External links
 Australian Caterpillars
 UKmoths
 Australian Faunal Directory

Opogona
Moths of Africa
Moths of Mauritius
Lepidoptera of Ethiopia
Moths of Réunion
Moths of New Zealand
Moths of Europe
Moths described in 1893
Taxa named by Edward Meyrick